Agha Ashurov (1886 – 1936) was an Azerbaijani statesman who served as Minister of Industry and Trade and Minister of Postal Service and Telegraph of Azerbaijan Democratic Republic, and was member of Parliament of Azerbaijan.

Early years
He was the second son of international trading and shipping tycoon, Haji Aslan Ashurov. The Ashurov family of Baku traces its trading and shipping operations back to the early eighteenth century. The family was politically active since the Tsarist period: Agha's uncle, Ali Iskander Ashurov (known as Iskander Ashurov) was a prominent member of the All-Russia Congress of Muslims and also of the Ittifaqi al-Muslimin political party.

Agha Ashurov graduated from Baku Gymnasium and from an Engineering Technology Department of a university in Germany. Upon his return to Baku, he worked at the Baku Municipality Office. In 1908, he led a project for construction of a new Baku Power Station and participated in construction of Shollar water channel to Baku from Khachmaz. Ashurov also was a member of board of director of Nəşri-maarif publishing house.

Political career
In early 1900s, Ashurov was elected member to Baku City Duma and Executive Committee of Muslim National Council, frequently attending Baku Congresses of Caucasian Muslims. At the time of massacres of Azerbaijanis by Armenians and Bolsheviks in March 1918, Ashurov was a member of Muslim Representatives Committee, negotiating during peace talks with Revolutionary Defense Committee, Armenian National Council and Iranian Consul to Azerbaijan Habibullah khan.

After establishment of Azerbaijani Democratic Republic, Ashurov became a member of Musavat and member of Parliament of Azerbaijan. He was appointed Minister of Industry and Trade in the second cabinet of ADR on 17 June 1918. After administrative reforms within the Cabinet of Azerbaijan on 6 October 1918, the Ministry of Transportation (Railway Communications), Postal Service and Telegraph was divided into Ministry of Transportation and Ministry of Postal Service and Telegraph. Khudadat bey Malik-Aslanov remained as Minister of Transportation (Railway Communications) while Ashurov was appointed Minister of Postal Service and Telegraph. He was replaced by Aslan bey Safikurdski on 26 December 1918, when the new third cabinet was established.

During the invasion of Red Army, he was the only member of government who voted against surrendering to the Bolsheviks. Therefore, a warrant for his arrest was issued by Bolshevik, but Ashurov was able to escape. Unable to pass to Turkey, Ashurov stayed in Azerbaijan. He died in Rostov in 1936.

See also
Azerbaijani National Council
Cabinets of Azerbaijan Democratic Republic (1918-1920)
Current Cabinet of Azerbaijan Republic

References

1886 births
1936 deaths
Azerbaijan Democratic Republic politicians
Government ministers of Azerbaijan
Soviet rehabilitations
Politicians from Baku
Engineers from Baku
20th-century engineers